Cao Lan, sometimes Caolan or Man Cao-Lan, is a Tai language of northern Vietnam. It is spoken by the Cao Lan subgroup of the San Chay people. According to Pittayaporn (2009), it is closest to the Chongzuo and Shangsi Zhuang across the border in China, both of which are lumped under the apparently polyphyletic Yongnan Zhuang by Ethnologue. Together, Cao Lan, Chongzuo, and Shangsi form a primary branch of the Tai languages (Pittayaporn 2009).

Demographics 

Cao Lan is spoken by the Cao Lan subgroup of the San Chay people of Tuyên Quang Province. According to the people, the Cao Lan and Sán Chay peoples had arrived from southern China 400 years ago together as one group, even though they spoke two different languages. Notably, they both use Chinese characters to record their languages. Smaller numbers are also found in Xichou County, Yunnan, China and in the following provinces.

Yên Bái
Thái Nguyên
Vĩnh Phúc
Bắc Giang
Lạng Sơn
Quảng Ninh

Classification 
The Sán Chay speak a form of Chinese, while the Cao Lan speak a Tai language. Gregerson & Edmondson (1998) considers Caolan to have a combination of both Northern Tai and Central Tai features. Like the E language of northern Guangxi, Cao Lan also displays influences form Pinghua, a Chinese vernacular spoken in Guangxi, China. Haudricourt (1973) believes that the Cao Lan may have adopted a form of Tai when they had stopped in Guangxi during their historical southward migration. The Chinese-speaking Sán Chay, on the other hand, might have been a Yao (or Mienic-speaking) group, as the Yao of Fangcheng, Guangxi call themselves . Today, the Chinese-speaking Sán Chay live mostly in Quảng Ninh, whereas the Cao Lan are mostly concentrated in Tuyên Quang, Thái Nguyên, and Bắc Giang.

References

Further reading 

 

Languages of Vietnam
Tai languages